Roberto Jesús Castillo Guerrero (born January 5, 1984 in Santiago, Chile) is a Chilean former footballer who played as a striker.

Teams
  Palestino 2000-2006
  Everton 2006
  Deportes Antofagasta 2007
  Deportes La Serena 2008-2009
  Deportes Antofagasta 2010–2012
  San Marcos de Arica 2012
  Deportes Concepción 2013–2014
  Iberia 2015

Titles
  Deportes Antofagasta 2011 (Torneo Apertura Primera B Championship)
  San Marcos de Arica 2012 (Torneo Apertura Primera B Championship)

References
 
 

1984 births
Living people
Chilean footballers
Footballers from Santiago
Club Deportivo Palestino footballers
Everton de Viña del Mar footballers
C.D. Antofagasta footballers
Deportes La Serena footballers
San Marcos de Arica footballers
Deportes Concepción (Chile) footballers
Deportes Iberia footballers
Chilean Primera División players
Primera B de Chile players
Association football forwards